"Perdón" is a song by Mexican band Camila from their 2014 album, Elypse. It was released as a single in May 2014 and peaked on the US Hot Latin Songs at number 16 and on the Mexican Airplay chart at number four. On December 16, 2014, "Perdón" featuring Puerto Rican singer Ricky Martin was released as a digital single.

Music video
The music video for "Perdón" was released on YouTube on September 2, 2014.

Credits and personnel
Credits adapted from Allmusic.

Michael Bland – Bateria
Camila – Primary Artist
Mario Domm – Composer, Coros, Piano, Sintetizador
Ginés Carrión Espí – Score Preparation
Paul Forat – A&R
Josh Freese – Bateria
Ian Shelly Holmes – Coros
Carlos Murguía – Composer, Hammond B3, Piano
Rodrigo Ortega – Bateria
Carola Rosas – Coros
Mónica Vélez – Composer

Track listing

Charts

Weekly charts

Year-end charts

References 

Camila (band) songs
2014 singles
Sony Music Mexico singles
Songs written by Mario Domm
Songs written by Mónica Vélez